Bazzite is a beryllium scandium cyclosilicate mineral with chemical formula  ( or ). It crystallizes in the hexagonal crystal system typically as small blue hexagonal crystals up to 2 cm length. It has a Mohs hardness of 6.5-7 and a specific gravity of 2.77 to 2.85.

It is hard to distinguish from blue beryl.

Occurs in miarolitic cavities in granite, in alpine veins and in scandium bearing granitic pegmatites. It occurs associated with quartz, orthoclase, muscovite, laumontite, albite, hematite, calcite, chlorite, fluorite, beryl and bavenite.

It was first described from an occurrence in Baveno, Italy. Named after the discoverer, the Italian engineer Alessandro E. Bazzi.

References

Cyclosilicates